Turbo stenogyrus, common name the miniature turban, is a species of sea snail, marine gastropod mollusk in the family Turbinidae.

 Taxonomic status: Some authors place the name in the subgenus Turbo (Marmarostoma)

Description
The length of the shell varies between 10 mm and 35 mm. The acute, elongate, imperforate shell has an ovate-conic shape. The six whorls are rounded, transversely lirate, radiate and finely striate. The body whorlscarcely exceeds the balance of the shell in length. The suture is margined. The lirae are narrow.  Below the shell has flat ribs.  The interstices and below the suture are striate. The circular aperture is silvery within. The columella is regularly arcuate and not produced at its base. The color pattern of the shell is pale green, with chestnut maculations, the lirae are white and brown articulated.

This species is host to the ectoparasitic copepod Parapanaietis turbo Hoshina & Kuwabara, 1958

Distribution
This species occurs in the southwest Pacific and off Japan, the Philippines and Indonesia.

References

 Alf A. & Kreipl K. (2003). A Conchological Iconography: The Family Turbinidae, Subfamily Turbininae, Genus Turbo. Conchbooks, Hackenheim Germany.
 Alf A. & Kreipl K. (2011) The family Turbinidae. Subfamily Turbinidae, Genus Turbo. Errata, corrections and new information on the genera Lunella, Modelia and Turbo (vol. I). In: G.T. Poppe & K. Groh (eds), A Conchological Iconography. Hackenheim: Conchbooks. pp. 69–72, pls 96–103.

External links
 Fischer, P. (1873). Diagnoses specierum novarum. Journal de Conchyliologie. 21(2): 126-127
 Williams, S.T. (2007). Origins and diversification of Indo-West Pacific marine fauna: evolutionary history and biogeography of turban shells (Gastropoda, Turbinidae). Biological Journal of the Linnean Society, 2007, 92, 573–592
 

stenogyrus
Gastropods described in 1873